John Henry Ganzel (April 7, 1874 – January 14, 1959) was an American first baseman and manager in Major League Baseball. Ganzel batted and threw right-handed. He played with the Pittsburgh Pirates (1898), Chicago Cubs (1900), New York Giants (1902) New York Highlanders (1903–1904) and the Cincinnati Reds (1907–1908). He hit the first ever Yankee home run on May 11, . 
 
A native of Kalamazoo, Michigan, Ganzel came from a family of baseball men. His brother, Charlie, was a catcher who played with the St. Paul Saints, Philadelphia Phillies, Detroit Wolverines and Boston Beaneaters during 14 seasons, and his nephew Babe Ganzel was an outfielder for the Washington Senators. Two brothers and two nephews also played in the minor leagues.

In a seven-season career, Ganzel was a .251 hitter with 18 home runs and 336 runs batted in during 747 games played. As a manager, he posted a 90–99 record for a .476 winning percentage.

Following his major league career, Ganzel managed several minor league clubs. In 1938 he headed the Orlando franchise of the Florida State League and was active with the club until his retirement in 1952.

Ganzel died in Orlando, Florida at the age of 84.

See also
List of Major League Baseball annual triples leaders
List of Major League Baseball player-managers

References

External links

John Ganzel - Baseballbiography.com
The Deadball Era

Chicago Orphans players
Cincinnati Reds managers
Cincinnati Reds players
Brooklyn Tip-Tops managers
Major League Baseball first basemen
Baseball players from Michigan
New York Giants (NL) players
New York Highlanders players
Sportspeople from Kalamazoo, Michigan
Baseball players from Orlando, Florida
Pittsburgh Pirates players
19th-century baseball players
1874 births
1959 deaths
Minor league baseball managers
New Castle Salamanders players
Grand Rapids Bob-o-links players
Detroit Tigers (Western League) players
Kansas City Blues (baseball) players
Louisville Colonels (minor league) players
Grand Rapids Orphans players
Grand Rapids Wolverines players
Rochester Bronchos players
Rochester Hustlers players
Newburgh Dutchmen players
Newburgh Hillclimbers players
Poughkeepsie Honey Bugs players
Major League Baseball player-managers
Kansas City Blues (baseball) managers